The United States Post Office in Adel, Georgia is a building built in 1939. It is at 115 E. 4th Street (Georgia State Route 76) at the intersection with Parrish Avenue.  It is square, one story tall and is in the Colonial Revival style.  It was built by the Public Works Administration.  The main entrance has broad granite steps with a cast-iron railing.  The original wood double doors have been replaced.  It served ZIP Code 31620 and was used as a post office until 2001. It was listed on the National Register of Historic Places in 2009 as "United States Post Office-Adel, Georgia".  It is now houses the Cook County Historical Society Museum & Genealogical Library.

The post office included a New Deal mural, titled "Plantation Scene" painted by Alice Flint in 1941.  The mural now hangs in Adel's new, nonhistoric post office.

See also 
List of United States post offices

References

External links
 

National Register of Historic Places in Cook County, Georgia
Colonial Revival architecture in Georgia (U.S. state)
Government buildings completed in 1939
Buildings and structures in Cook County, Georgia
Post office buildings on the National Register of Historic Places in Georgia (U.S. state)
1939 establishments in Georgia (U.S. state)